The National Museum of Montenegro is the largest museum in Montenegro. The museum was established in 1896 and is located in Cetinje, Montenegro.

Departments
The museum is divided into five departments:
Historical Museum of Montenegro
Ethnographic Museum of Montenegro
Artistic Museum of Montenegro
King Nikola's Palace
Biljarda, Museum of Petar II Petrović Njegoš

Possessions
The museum possesses the Oktoih Prvoglasnik, a significant printed work from the late 15th century. It also host the original icon of Our Lady of Philermos, which had been in the possession of the Order of St. John since the Crusades.

Around 3000 artifacts owned by the museum can't be located and they are presumed to be stolen over the years.

Bibliography

References

External links 
 National Museum of Montenegro website
 Njegoskij|org :: "The Montenegrin Ministry of Culture publishes the electronic edition of its 2007 National Museum Guidebook"

Montenegrin culture
Montenegro
Cetinje
Museums in Montenegro